Manulea bicolor, the bicolored moth or yellow-edged footman, is a moth of the family Erebidae. It is found in boreal North America, from Labrador and Massachusetts to Yukon and British Columbia. In the Rocky Mountains, it ranges south to southern Colorado. The habitat consists of boreal forests, parklands and riparian cottonwoods in the prairies.

The length of the forewings is 13–17 mm. The wings are dull medium to dark grey. The costa of the forewings is bright ochre yellow. Adult males are on wing from July to August. Females are brachypterous.

The larvae feed on lichens growing on conifers, although the larvae may also feed on the conifer needles themselves.

References

Moths described in 1864
Lithosiina
Moths of North America